Dorota Idzi (born 8 May 1966) is a Polish modern pentathlete. She competed in women's modern pentathlon at the 2000 Summer Olympics in Sydney.

References

External links

1966 births
Living people
Polish female modern pentathletes
Olympic modern pentathletes of Poland
Modern pentathletes at the 2000 Summer Olympics